Rocambole is a fictional adventurer created by Pierre Alexis Ponson du Terrail, a 19th-century French writer. The word rocambolesque has become common in French and other languages to label any kind of fantastic adventure.

Overview
The series introduces Rocambole as a highly resourceful adolescent, an orphan adopted by the wily crone Maman Fipart. He first assists the evil Andrea de Felipone, a.k.a. Sir Williams, in his fight against Andrea's half-brother, the Comte de Kergaz. A major protagonist in the battle is a courtesan with a heart of gold and a fearless temper, Louise Charmet, a.k.a. Baccarat.

In the third novel of the series, Rocambole takes over and kills Sir Williams. But Baccarat again thwarts his evil schemes, and he ends up imprisoned in the hard labor camp of Toulon (like Jean Valjean in Victor Hugo's 1862 novel Les Misérables.)

In the fourth novel, an older and wiser Rocambole, who has been pardoned, has become a do-gooder; however, the feuilleton (installment) was not popular with the readers, and Ponson du Terrail re-wrote a new version in which Rocambole escapes from Toulon, redeems himself and becomes a full-fledged hero.

The later novels portray Rocambole as a fearless hero fighting a variety of dastardly villains such as the Thuggee, etc. He has become a veritable mastermind who has been to India and has gathered around him a coterie of equally talented assistants.

Rocambole anticipates characters such as A. J. Raffles, Arsène Lupin, Fantômas, The Saint, Doc Savage, Judex and The Shadow.

In a final chapter to the sixth volume, Ponson du Terrail revealed that Rocambole really existed and was narrating his own exploits through him, making Rocambole perhaps the first metafictional hero of his kind.

Books
 Les Drames de Paris (1857) (aka L'Héritage Mystérieux)
 Le Club des Valets de Coeur (1858)
 Les Exploits de Rocambole (1858–59)
 Les Chevaliers du Clair de Lune (1860–62)
 La Résurrection de Rocambole (1865–66) (this novel rewrites and supersedes 4 above)
 Le Dernier Mot de Rocambole (1866–67)
 Les Misères de Londres (1867–68)
 Les Démolitions de Paris (1869)
 La Corde du Pendu (1870, never completed)

By other writers

 by Contant Gueroult:
 Le Retour et la Fin de Rocambole (1875)
 Les Nouveaux Exploits de Rocambole (1880)
 by Jules Cardoze:
 Les Bâtards de Rocambole (1886)
 by Leite Bastos:
 As Maravilhas do Homem Pardo (188?) (Portuguese-language sequel to La Corde du Pendu.)
by Frédéric Valade:
 Le Petit-Fils de Rocambole (1922)
 La Haine immortelle (1922)
 Le Testament de Rocambole (1931)
 Olivia contre Rocambole (1931)
 La Justice de Rocambole (1932)
 La Belle Olivia (1932)
 Les Larmes de Rocambole (1933)
 Le Châtiment d'Olivia (1933)
 by Michel Honaker:
 Rocambole et le Spectre de Kerloven (2002) (This series of novels crosses over Rocambole and Paul Féval's Les Habits Noirs).
 Rocambole et les Marionnettes de la Mort (2003) [Rocambole and the Puppets of Death]
 Rocambole et le Pacte de Sang (2004) [Rocambole and the Pact of Blood]
 Rocambole et le Diable de Montrouge (2005) [Rocambole and the Devil of Montrouge] (2005)
 Rocambole et la Sorcière du Marais (2005) [Rocambole and the Witch of the Marais] (2005)

Films
 Rocambole (Fr.; serial, B&W., 1914)
 Rocambole (Fr.; serial, B&W., 1924)
 Rocambole (Fr.; B&W., 1932)
 Rocambole (Mexico; B&W., 69 min., 1946)
 Rocambole (Fr.; B&W., 105 min., 1948)
 The Revenge of Baccarat (Fr.; B&W., 105 min., 1948)
  (Fr.; col., 100 min., 1963)

Television
Rocambole (French ORTF, B&W., three seasons of twenty-six 15-min. episodes, 1964–65)

Comics
Hungarian comics artist György Szitas adapted Rocamble into a comic strip.

External links
The French Wold Newton Universe – Rocambole
Ebooks gratuits search for the auteur Ponson du Terrail

Notes

Fictional detectives
Fictional French people in literature
Literary characters introduced in 1857
Male characters in literature
Orphan characters in literature